Pike's Peak Grange No. 163 is an historic Grange hall located at 3093 N. State Highway 83 in Franktown, Colorado. Pike's Peak Grange No. 163 was organized in 1908 and its meeting hall was built the next year. It was the successor to Fonder Grange founded in Franktown in 1875.

On October 1, 1990, Pike's Peak Grange No. 163 was added to the National Register of Historic Places.

See also
National Register of Historic Places listings in Douglas County, Colorado

References

External links
 Pike's Peak Grange # 163 website
 North Central Colorado Historical Markers - The Grange

Clubhouses on the National Register of Historic Places in Colorado
Buildings and structures completed in 1909
Buildings and structures in Douglas County, Colorado
Grange organizations and buildings in Colorado
Grange buildings on the National Register of Historic Places
National Register of Historic Places in Douglas County, Colorado